Sir Ian Graham Turbott  (9 March 1922 – 11 August 2016) was a New Zealand-Australian diplomat and university administrator.

Early life and education
Turbott was born in Whangārei, New Zealand, and attended Takapuna Grammar School. He later studied at Auckland University College and Jesus College, Cambridge. He served six years in the New Zealand Army as part of the Second New Zealand Expeditionary Force during World War II, including service in Italy, the South Pacific and south-west Asia. He left the army with the rank of captain.

Working life
After leaving uniformed service, Turbott joined the British Colonial Service with an appointment to the Gilbert and Ellice Islands Colony. After a secondment to the British Colonial Office, he served as Administrator of Antigua between 1958 and 1964. In 1964 he was appointed Administrator of Grenada, continuing in the role after it became a governorship in 1967. He left Grenada in 1968. After two years in Britain, he emigrated to Australia, where he entered business. Between 1989 and 2000 Turbott served as chancellor of the University of Western Sydney.

Turbott was the honorary consul-general for the Cook Islands in New South Wales from 1995 until his death.

Community 
Turbott was appointed (1982–1954) as both the NSW chair of the Duke of Edinburgh's International Award – Australia and a national board director.

Honours
Turbott was made a knight bachelor in the 1968 British New Year's Honours List. In 1985 he was named Australian Father of the Year.

Personal life
Turbott met his future wife, Nancy Lantz, on Christmas Eve 1951 when a Pan Am Boeing Stratocruiser on which she was a flight attendant landed on Canton Island, where he was stationed. They married soon after in the United States. Together they had three daughters. He died on 11 August 2016.

References

1922 births
2016 deaths
People from Whangārei
Governors of British Grenada
New Zealand emigrants to Australia
Governors of Antigua and Barbuda
Chancellors of Western Sydney University
New Zealand military personnel of World War II
New Zealand Knights Bachelor
Australian Knights Bachelor
Officers of the Order of Australia
Australian Companions of the Order of St Michael and St George
Australian Commanders of the Royal Victorian Order
People educated at Takapuna Grammar School
New Zealand expatriates in the United Kingdom
Expatriates in Kiribati
New Zealand expatriates in Tuvalu